Joseph Karr O'Connor (May 23, 1953 – January 3, 2020) was an American computer scientist, accessibility advocate, and a main accessibility contributor to WordPress.

Accessibility contributions
O’Connor became the Accessibility Team representative for WordPress in 2013, leading the team through 2015 and stepping down in 2016. He created the Accessibility Cities initiative, enlisting volunteers from an international group of designers to create free and accessible WordPress themes named after the cities the designers were from. The initiative led to sixteen different accessible themes moving into development. Partially as a result of this initiative, WordPress went from zero to eighteen accessible themes from 2013 to 2014.

O’Connor spoke at many events about WordPress and accessibility, on topics such as how to build accessible WordPress themes, how to build accessible user experience (UX) by creating personas with disabilities, and how to create accessible UX in a WordPress site. O’Connor and Joe Dolson discussed their work on WordPress accessibility in a 2014 episode of the Web Axe podcast. O’Connor was also a featured guest on A Podcast for Everyone, the podcast companion to the book A Web for Everyone. He spoke with co-author Whitney Quesenbery about the importance of improving accessibility in WordPress, given its extensive use as a website authoring platform. “We owe it to our fellow human beings to make things accessible.”

O’Connor was active in other accessibility advocacy and outreach activities. He was founder and organizer of the Los Angeles Accessibility and Inclusive Design group, whose activities included regular events for Global Accessibility Awareness Day. He was a regular attendee of the CSUN Assistive Technology Conference; his participation included presenting on accessibility of Twitter with Dennis Lembrée, creator of Easy Chirp, an accessible alternative to Twitter. O’Connor’s final submission to the CSUN conference was on Accessible Death – Proposal, discussing how to help a family member with intellectual disabilities deal with the death of a parent. He did not live to give the talk.

O’Connor worked on web accessibility at Southern California Institute of Architecture (SCI-Arc), Pasadena City College, and California State University, Northridge (CSUN), as well maintained a side business doing web accessibility. He was active with the CSUN Academic Technology Committee, often advocating for better ADA compliance. In 2011, California State University, Northridge was ranked second among 183 colleges and universities in the United States for the accessibility of its website. O’Connor, who was web manager, responded by saying, “This honor, by no means definitive, is nonetheless an indication that we are on the right track. When we create websites, we are mindful of the welfare of all of our students, faculty, staff, and the public.”

O’Connor inspired many in the accessibility community. He was acknowledged by Jared Smith, Associate Director of WebAIM, in the introduction of a new model for motivating accessibility change, encouraging people doing accessibility work to “spend at least as much time motivating for change as we do educating on implementation details.” Author Natalie MacLees referenced O’Connor’s contributions in the second edition of jQuery for Designers: Beginner’s Guide. 

In her tribute, civil rights lawyer Lainey Feingold recognized O’Connor’s role as “accessibility champion” and “creator and maintainer of the global accessibility community.” Her 2020 Digital Accessibility Legal Update, a highlight of the annual CSUN Assistive Technology Conference, was to be dedicated to O’Connor and fellow accessibility leader James W. Thatcher; however, the session was canceled due to COVID-19.

Personal life
O'Connor was born in Hackensack, New Jersey, to Lucy Lynam O’Connor and Joseph O’Connor, on May 23, 1953. He graduated from Fordham University in 1975, and pursued a career in film. Joseph had a part in the 1993 movie A Formula for Mayhem. He married Linda in 1988 and his wife's purchase of a Macintosh computer inspired him to transition to a career in technology. Their daughter was born in 1992. 

Joseph O'Connor died on January 3, 2020.

References

External links 
 Accessible WordPress podcast episode with O'Connor

1953 births
2020 deaths
American computer scientists
Fordham University alumni
Web accessibility
WordPress
American disability rights activists
People from Hackensack, New Jersey
Free software programmers